Mathieu de la Porte  (Nijmegen, 17th century - 1722) was a French mathematician.

Life 
De la Porte was the son of a French merchant who had moved to the Netherlands. He moved back to France when he was 18 and recanted the Protestant faith. He joined the guild of the "maître écrivain" and taught accounting and arithmetic.

His work "Guide des negocians" is known as one of the most popular books about Double-entry bookkeeping system and had 23 editions between 1685 and 1787.

Works

References 

French mathematicians
1722 deaths
17th-century births